Runtococha (possibly from in the Quechua spelling Runtuqucha; runtu egg, qucha lake, "egg lake", hispanicized spelling Runtococha) is a lake in the Cordillera Blanca in the Andes of  Peru located in the Ancash Region, Asunción Province, Chacas District. Runtococha lies northeast of the lake Yanacocha and east of the lake Huegroncocha.

References 

Lakes of Peru
Lakes of Ancash Region